In late April 2014, a tornado outbreak in the central and southern United States produced multiple long-track tornadoes – at least seven were deadly, causing over 35 fatalities. One additional death occurred in Florida, due to severe flooding associated with this system.

Confirmed tornadoes

April 27 event

April 28 event

April 29 event

April 30 event

See also
Tornadoes of 2014
Tornado outbreak of April 27–30, 2014

Notes

References

F4 tornadoes by date
Tornadoes in Arkansas
Tornadoes in Mississippi
Tornadoes in Missouri
Tornadoes in Nebraska
Tornadoes in Oklahoma
Tornadoes in Alabama
Tornadoes in Tennessee
Tornadoes of 2014
Tornado outbreak
2014 in Arkansas
2014 in Mississippi
2014 in Missouri
2014 in Nebraska
2014 in Oklahoma
Tornado outbreak